Lui Shtini (born 1978 in Kavajë, Albania) is an artist, currently living and working in New York. He received his BFA in 2000 from the Academy of Arts in Tirana. Since his move to New York, he has attended Skowhegan School of Painting and Sculpture, and was the recipient of a New York Foundation for the Arts Fellowship in painting in 2010.

References

1978 births
Living people
Painters from Kavajë
Albanian painters
Skowhegan School of Painting and Sculpture alumni